Joe Craig (born 31 December 1981 in London) is an English children's novelist and musician. 
He is best known for the Jimmy Coates series of books.

Early life and education
Craig was born and grew up in the Finchley neighbourhood of north London. His mother is a poet and his two sisters are also writers.

He studied philosophy at Emmanuel College, Cambridge, where he wrote and composed music for the Cambridge Footlights.

Career
In 2002, he provided the score for the musical theatre production Told You So: A Musical Hijacking of Aesop's Fables (book and lyrics by John Finnemore).

His first children's book, Jimmy Coates: Killer, was published in 2005. He described the plot as being about "a boy on the run from the secret service, battling Britain’s dictatorship, while resisting his own genetic programming that gives him the instincts and abilities of an assassin". He followed it with six more Jimmy Coates books, and as of 2017, the series had sold over 250,000 copies and been translated into twelve languages.

He regularly performs school visits to encourage reading and promote his books. In 2015, he told The Bookseller that schools were becoming more reluctant to pay authors for visits, but he maintained that authors should never do them for free. He said that author visits show children that the world of books is "full of life, passion and thrills...My aim with every school event I do is to make my visit the single most memorable event in the school life of every student in the room".

In 2010, Craig released an album of songs which he wrote and performed himself: The Songman & Me, Vol. 1.

Personal life

He met anthropologist and television presenter Mary-Ann Ochota when they attended Cambridge University together; they began dating in 2000 and eventually married. Their son, Cole, was born in July 2018. They live in Highgate, London.

Craig played cricket for the Authors XI team of British writers during the 2012-13 season.

Books
 Jimmy Coates: Killer, HarperCollins Children's Books, March 2005, 
(Released in the United States under the title Jimmy Coates: Assassin.) 
 Jimmy Coates: Target, HarperCollins Children's Books, May 2006, 
 Jimmy Coates: Revenge, HarperCollins Children's Books, January 2007, 
 Jimmy Coates: Sabotage, HarperCollins Children's Books, October 2007, 
 Jimmy Coates: Survival, HarperCollins Children's Books, April 2008, 
 Jimmy Coates: Power, HarperCollins Children's Books, October 2008, 
 Jimmy Coates: Blackout, HarperCollins Children's Books, June 2013, 
 Lifters, Franklin Watts, September 2011, 
 World of Robots: Jango, Rising Stars, February 2019, 
 World of Robots: Wild, Rising Stars, February 2019, 
 World of Robots: Breakdown, Rising Stars, February 2019, 
 World of Robots: Hijack, Rising Stars, February 2019, 

Short e-books:
 Save the Human, CB Creative Books, December 2014
 Head Strong, CB Creative Books, December 2014
 The Mendack Affair, CB Creative Books, December 2014

Discography

References

External links

 Joe Craig's Official Website
 Official Jimmy Coates Website
 Joe Craig's Blog
 HarperCollins Children's Books - Joe Craig
 Joe Craig's music page

1981 births
Living people
English children's writers
Alumni of Emmanuel College, Cambridge
People educated at University College School
Writers from London
Musicians from London
English male writers